Trichomyia is a genus of flies belonging to the family Psychodidae.

The genus has cosmopolitan distribution.

Species

Species:

Trichomyia acanthostylis 
Trichomyia amazonensis
Trichomyia ancyropenis

References

Psychodidae